The women's omnium competition at the 2018 Asian Games was held on 29 August 2018 at the Jakarta International Velodrome.

Schedule
All times are Western Indonesia Time (UTC+07:00)

Results

Scratch race

Tempo race

Elimination race

Points race

Summary

References

Track Women omnium